The Secunderabad–Falaknuma route (SF) is a rapid transit service of the Multi-Modal Transport System of Hyderabad, India. Spanning 12 stations, it runs between Secunderabad and Falaknuma twice a day.

Stations

External links
MMTS Train Timings 

Hyderabad MMTS